Sonne Hagal is a German experimental and neofolk group.

History
The band originates from Rathenow in Brandenburg where the core line-up was formed in 1992. The members were part of the local punk rock and experimental pop music scene. The early records from the 1990s were electronic music. A breakthrough came with the 10" album Sinnreger from 2000, where the band had adopted conventions from the dark wave and neofolk genres. The album includes the German folk song "Herbstlied", a poem by the expressionist poet Else Lasker-Schüler, and a track based on an agitation song by Rosa Luxemburg. The following releases deepened the band's interest in runes, Eddic poetry and nature lyricism, and saw collaborations with Andreas Ritter of Forseti and Kim Larsen of Of the Wand & the Moon. On the album Sonne Hagal vs. Polarzirkel the band collaborated with the electronic sound artists Polarzirkel and Nerthus to create atonal music with ritualistic elements. On the 2005 single "Dygel" they collaborated with Ian Read and Matt Howden.

The members of the band have chosen to be anonymous. The name was chosen to reflect the thematic interest in runes and Northern European mysticism. Sonne is German for sun and hagal is one of the runes. According to the singer of the band, modern people can learn a lot from ancient religion and philosophy. He has stressed the advantages of polytheism, harmony with the laws of nature, the ability to find holiness in many places, the view of humans as part of nature, and how the runes can teach people about nondualism.

Discography

Albums and EPs

Compilations

References

External links
 Official
Official Sonne Hagal Site

 Unofficial
Interview with Sonne Hagal on funprox.com
Interview with Sonne Hagal on heathenharvest.com

Neofolk music groups
German musical groups
Modern pagan musical groups
Modern paganism in Germany